Michael Lee Bruner (born July 23, 1956) is an American former competition swimmer, two-time Olympic champion, and former world record-holder in two events. At the 1976 Olympics he won gold medals in the 4×200-meter freestyle relay and in the 200-meter butterfly, setting a world record. Two years later he won the 1978 World Championships in the 200 m butterfly. During his career Bruner set two world records: in the 200-meter butterfly (1:59.23) and in relay.

Swimming World Magazine named Bruner its American swimmer of the year in 1980.  He was inducted into the International Swimming Hall of Fame as an "Honor Swimmer" in 1988.

See also

 List of Olympic medalists in swimming (men)
 List of Stanford University people
 List of World Aquatics Championships medalists in swimming (men)
 World record progression 200 metres butterfly
 World record progression 4 × 200 metres freestyle relay

References

External links

 

1956 births
Living people
American male butterfly swimmers
American male freestyle swimmers
World record setters in swimming
Olympic gold medalists for the United States in swimming
Sportspeople from Omaha, Nebraska
Stanford Cardinal men's swimmers
Swimmers at the 1976 Summer Olympics
World Aquatics Championships medalists in swimming
Medalists at the 1976 Summer Olympics